Gauhar Raza (born 17 August 1956) is an Indian scientist by profession, and a leading Urdu poet, social activist and documentary filmmaker working to popularize the understanding of science among general public, known for his films like Jung-e-Azadi, on the India's First War of Independence, and Inqilab (2008) on Bhagat Singh. He was also the honorary director of Jahangirabad Media Institute.

Early life and education

Born in Allahabad, Uttar Pradesh, India on 17 August 1956. His family shifted to Aligarh in 1958. His father Wizarat Husain (1919 = 2007) was a freedom fighter, a communist party member and a renowned educationist and science teacher in Aligarh Muslim University, Aligarh. His mother, a social worker, was also intensely involved in freedom struggle and had worked with Indira Gandhi in Allahabad.

He completed a BSc in Engineering from Aligarh Muslim University (AMU), in 1977 and MTech in Power Apparatus and Systems from Indian Institute of Technology, Delhi in 1979. He was a member of Students' Federation of India when he studied in AMU. During the Emergency, he was the SFI Secretary of Western Uttar Pradesh.

Career

In 1979 he joined Eicher Goodearth Ltd., a multinational company as an electrical engineer and worked there for 3 years. Solved a few major design problems that the company was facing and within a short span of time he rose to Executive-Engineer level. In 1982 he joined the National Institute of Science, Technology and Development Studies as a scientist and still to work continues there.

Poetry
Gauhar Raza's poetry collection Jazbon Ki Lau Tez Karon has been noticed for the frankness of tone and for the social concerns that they take up and treat sensitively. In his most famous poem "Main Chahta hoon"(I like to), he express his helplessness to write a romantic poem in the days of darkness. He also wrote lyrics for a Hindi film Say Salaam India released in 2007.

Personal life
He is married to activist Shabnam Hashmi, sister of the slain theatre activist Safdar Hashmi. The couple have a son, Sahir Raza, and a daughter, Seher.

Works

 Plague, Media and People, NITADS, 1996 (co-writers: Bharvi Dutt and Surjit Singh)
 Confluence of Science and Peoples' Knowledge at the Sangam, NISTADS, 1996 (co-writers: Surjit Singh, Bharvi Dutt and Jagdish Chander)
 A Delicate Space Ship, Youth for Disarmament, Delhi, 1998
 Jazbon Ki Lau Tez Karo, Raj Kamal, Delhi, 1999
 Walk the Sky, A play on violence against women, V-Day, Delhi, 2001
 Science Crafts and Knowledge: Understanding of Science Among Artisans in India and South Africa: a Cross-cultural Endeavour, Protea Book House, Pretoria, 2002 edited along with Hester du Plessis
 HIV/AIDS Public Understanding and Attitude, NYKS, 2007 (co-writers: Surjit Singh and Chader Shekhar Pran)

Awards
 Best subject expert for educational film in 1999 by the University Grants Commission.
 Creative Literature Award, Hindi Academy, 2001, for the collection of poems 'Jazbon Ki Lau Tez Karo'.
 For contribution to Science writings and propagation of Science, Urdu Academy, Delhi, 2002

References

External links
 
 Jahangirabad Media Institute, Lucknow, India, Jahangirabad Media Institute
 

Indian documentary filmmakers
1956 births
Living people
People from Aligarh
Aligarh Muslim University alumni
IIT Delhi alumni
Urdu-language poets from India
Activists from Uttar Pradesh
Scientists from Uttar Pradesh